Kabangu is a surname. Notable people with the surname include:

Elton Kabangu (born 1998), Belgian footballer
Kami Kabangu (born 1984), Congolese-Rwandan basketball player
Ngola Kabangu (born 1943), Angolan politician
Patou Kabangu (born 1985), Democratic Republic of the Congo footballer